Korean Ministry of Culture may refer to:
 Ministry of Culture, Sports and Tourism (South Korea)
  of the cabinet of North Korea